originally released as  is a 2005 Japanese Pink film directed by Shinji Imaoka. It was chosen as Best Film of the year at the Pink Grand Prix ceremony. According to author Jasper Sharp, the title, "Frog Song" is a pun referring both to a full-sized frog costume found outside a train station and worn by one of the characters, and to the Japanese verb kaeru "to go home". The translation of the title of the film could thus also be "Going Home Song".

Synopsis
Akemi is a housewife who discovers her husband has been cheating on her. She makes the acquaintance of a prostitute who hopes to become a manga artist. Another hopeful manga artist, Kyoko, also makes ends meet by working as a part-time prostitute. Akemi moves in with Kyoko and tolerating the practise of her profession while the two come to an understanding of each other's lives.

Cast
 Konatsu: Akemi Kudo
 Rinako Hirasawa: Kyoko Ito
 Takeshi Itō: Jiro Kiyokawa
 Yōta Kawase: Saburo Kiyokawa
 Kurumi Nanase: Nagisa
 Mutsuo Yoshioka: Kudo

Critical reception
The Pink film community awarded Frog Song with the title of Best Film at the Pink Grand Prix. Honors given to the film also included the Best Actress award, which was given to lead actress Konatsu, and Best New Actress for Rinako Hirasawa.

Allmovie calls Frog Song a "playfully eccentric slice of pink cinema".
In his Behind the Pink Curtain, Anglophone pink film scholar Jasper Sharp writes that it is the upbeat nature of Imaoka's films which have helped make them popular with film audiences. Pointing out the musical scene which concludes the film, he writes, "...Another key to the popularity of Imaoka's films is that they often end on such uplifting high notes."

Availability
The film was first released theatrically under the title Paid Companionship Story: Girls Who Want to Do It. As with many pink films it was retitled when it was released on DVD. It was first released as Frog Song on DVD in Japan on January 14, 2006. It is under this title  that the film is most widely known, and it has retained this title in international releases. Using the Frog Song title, Sacrament released the DVD with English subtitles in the U.S. on November 13, 2007.

Bibliography

English

Japanese

References

2005 films
Films directed by Shinji Imaoka
2000s Japanese-language films
Pink films
Shintōhō Eiga films
2000s Japanese films